Whangarei District is a territorial authority district in the Northland Region of New Zealand that is governed by the Whangarei District Council. The district is made up in area largely by rural land, and includes a fifth of the Northland Region. It extends southwards to the southern end of Bream Bay, northwards to Whangaruru and almost to the Bay of Islands, and westwards up the Mangakahia River valley past Pakotai and almost to Waipoua Forest. It includes the Hen and Chicken Islands and the Poor Knights Islands.

The principal urban area and district seat is the city of Whangārei. Other towns include Hūkerenui, Hikurangi, Titoki, Portland, Ruakākā and Waipu. The district population was 

The district contains beaches such as Ngunguru, game fishing at Tutukaka, a variety of beaches along Whangārei Harbour, as well as Matakohe or Limestone Island in the Harbour, now subject to ecological restoration. The main airport for the district is Whangarei Airport.

Demographics

Whangarei District had a population of 90,960 at the 2018 New Zealand census, an increase of 13,965 people (18.1%) since the 2013 census, and an increase of 16,497 people (22.2%) since the 2006 census. There were 32,745 households. There were 44,583 males and 46,374 females, giving a sex ratio of 0.96 males per female. The median age was 41.4 years (compared with 37.4 years nationally), with 19,119 people (21.0%) aged under 15 years, 15,132 (16.6%) aged 15 to 29, 39,381 (43.3%) aged 30 to 64, and 17,328 (19.1%) aged 65 or older.

Ethnicities were 77.0% European/Pākehā, 30.1% Māori, 3.9% Pacific peoples, 4.9% Asian, and 1.8% other ethnicities. People may identify with more than one ethnicity.

The percentage of people born overseas was 17.0, compared with 27.1% nationally.

Although some people objected to giving their religion, 52.1% had no religion, 34.5% were Christian, 2.6% had Māori religious beliefs, 0.8% were Hindu, 0.2% were Muslim, 0.6% were Buddhist and 1.9% had other religions.

Of those at least 15 years old, 11,766 (16.4%) people had a bachelor or higher degree, and 14,673 (20.4%) people had no formal qualifications. The median income was $27,500, compared with $31,800 nationally. 9,699 people (13.5%) earned over $70,000 compared to 17.2% nationally. The employment status of those at least 15 was that 32,430 (45.1%) people were employed full-time, 10,353 (14.4%) were part-time, and 3,354 (4.7%) were unemployed.

Government
Whangarei District Council was formed by an amalgamation of Whangarei City Council, Whangarei County Council and Hikurangi Town Council as part of New Zealand's 1989 local government reforms.

There are six wards, which is more than in 1989. The main part of Whangārei city is divided into the northern ward of Denby, and the southern ward of Okara. The other four wards are Hikurangi-Coastal in the north, Mangakahia-Maungatapere inland to the west, Bream Bay in the south, and Whangārei Heads to the east of the city.

The mayor is Sheryl Mai.

References

External links

 Whangarei District Council
 Official promotional website for Whangarei District